Exaeretia preisseckeri is a moth of the family Depressariidae. It is found in Italy, Austria, the Czech Republic, Hungary, Romania and Bulgaria.

The wingspan is about 22 mm.

References

Moths described in 1937
Exaeretia
Moths of Europe